Jaśkowice  (German Jaschkowitz) is a village in the administrative district of Gmina Prószków, within Opole County, Opole Voivodeship, in south-western Poland.

The village has a population of 260.

External links 
 Jewish Community in Jaśkowice on Virtual Shtetl

References

Villages in Opole County